Brian Grant (born 19 June 1964) is a Scottish football coach and former professional footballer who is who played as a midfielder. He is currently head of player pathway and loans at Scottish Premiership club Dundee United. He spent twelve years as a player with Aberdeen, making over 300 appearances and winning three major trophies. He also played for Stirling Albion, Hibernian and Dundee.

Playing career
Grant began his career in the early 1980s with local Stirling Albion, recovering from a double leg fracture before joining Alex Ferguson's Aberdeen in 1984. He took some time to become a regular in the side ahead of older players who had won several domestic and European trophies, but became established towards the end of the decade, winning both the Scottish League Cup and the Scottish Cup in the 1989–90 season, as well as playing a part in several other finals and runners-up finishes in the Scottish Premier Division (losing out to Rangers on every occasion). He later lifted the League Cup again in 1995, a few months after helping the club avoid what would have been a first-ever relegation via a play-off. In August 1996, Aberdeen played Everton in a testimonial for Grant, with the 9,000-plus crowd witnessing a 3–1 win for the Merseyside team.

Midway through the 1996-97 season, Grant joined Hibernian for a £75,000 fee, spending little over a year at Easter Road before a March 1998 move to Dundee. Towards the end of the 1998-99 season, returned to first club Stirling on loan, scoring in what turned out to be his final match at senior level. Grant moved on to Bellshill Athletic at the end of the season and chose not to remain in football after retiring.

Later work
After retiring as a player, Grant managed a McDonald's franchise in Forfar. He also remained involved in football, coaching Dundee United youth teams. In February 2019, with the appointment of Andy Goldie as the club's new academy director, Grant moved to a new role as head of player pathway and loans.

Personal life
Grant is the father of former Falkirk player Thomas Grant.

Career statistics

Club 
Appearances and goals by club, season and competition

Honours
Aberdeen
Scottish Premier Division: Runners-up 1988–89, 1989–90, 1990–91, 1992–93, 1993–94
Scottish Cup: 1989–90
Runners-up 1992–93
Scottish League Cup: 1989–90, 1995–96
Runners-up 1987–88, 1992–93

References

External links
 
 

1964 births
Living people
Scottish footballers
Scottish Football League players
Stirling Albion F.C. players
Aberdeen F.C. players
Hibernian F.C. players
Dundee F.C. players
Dundee United F.C. non-playing staff
Bellshill Athletic F.C. players
Association football midfielders
Footballers from Stirling (council area)
Scottish Premier League players
Scottish Junior Football Association players